is a Game Boy game released in 1991 and the first game in the Goemon series ever released for a portable system. Gameplay is similar to Ganbare Goemon! Karakuri Dōchū which was released on the Famicom. Only Goemon is playable, and the game consists of him rescuing Ebisumaru; Sasuke and Yae do not make appearances.

Release history
It was originally only released in Japan. In 1997 Konami started releasing the Konami GB Collection, a collection of four older Konami games re-released with a Super Game Boy color palette and borders added. Goemon was released in Volume 2 in Japan. In 2000 they were again updated for the Game Boy Color, translated, and released in Europe. For the European release the order for the games was altered so what was Vol. 4 in Japan became Vol. 2, with the Japanese Vol. 2 and 3 becoming Vol. 3 and 4. For the European port the title screen was changed to Mystical Ninja Starring Goemon, and just "Starring Goemon" on the game select screen since the most recent Goemon games released in Europe were Mystical Ninja Starring Goemon and Mystical Ninja 2 Starring Goemon. The original Game Boy version of the game was released on the 3DS Virtual Console in Japan in 2012.

References

1991 video games
Game Boy games
Game Boy Color games
Ganbare Goemon games
Video games developed in Japan
Virtual Console games

Single-player video games
Virtual Console games for Nintendo 3DS